Maba Jahou Jobe (born 1965?) is a Gambian politician. Born and raised in Bakau, he once served as an officer major and commander of the Gambian National Army until his appointment as assistant high commissioner to The Gambian embassy in the UK. Jobe was high commissioner to Nigeria from 1996 to 2001. 

In a surprise move, President Yahya Jammeh dissolved the Gambian cabinet on October 18, 2006. Jobe was appointed foreign minister for the new cabinet on October 20, replacing Lamin Kaba Bajo. Jammeh, however announced in a news broadcast on October 25 that he decided to revoke Jobe's ministership.

References

1960s births
Living people
High Commissioners of the Gambia to Nigeria
Foreign ministers of the Gambia
People from Farafenni
Gambian military personnel